WecA transferase may refer to:
 UDP-N-acetylglucosamine—undecaprenyl-phosphate N-acetylglucosaminephosphotransferase, an enzyme
 UDP-N-acetylglucosamine—decaprenyl-phosphate N-acetylglucosaminephosphotransferase, an enzyme